Callidula lunigera is a moth in the  family Callidulidae. It is found in New Guinea.

References

Callidulidae
Moths described in 1879